Deanna Ballard (born October 2, 1978) is an American politician served in the North Carolina Senate from the 45th district from 2016 to 2023.

Electoral history

2022

2020

2018

2016

References

1978 births
Living people
People from Blowing Rock, North Carolina
Republican Party North Carolina state senators
21st-century American politicians
North Carolina Republicans
North Carolina state senators